"Sunshine" is the second single released from Pop Idol runner-up Gareth Gates' second studio album, Go Your Own Way (2003). The single was released on 8 September 2003 and peaked at number three on the UK Singles Chart. This was the second single from Gates that failed to reach the top spot. The promotional video was infamously available to vote to enter the MTV2 viewers chart despite the channel being entirely an alternative rock format. It gained under 10 votes and was included to vote on as a joke.

Track listings

UK CD1
 "Sunshine"
 "Soul Affection"
 "Sunshine" (Bimbo Jones cub mix)
 "Sunshine" (video)

UK CD2
 "Sunshine"
 "Get to Know Me Better"
 "Sunshine" (Groovefinder club mix)
 Making of the video

European CD single
 "Sunshine" – 3:36
 "Get to Know Me Better" – 3:05

Australian CD single
 "Sunshine"
 "Get to Know Me Better"
 "Sunshine" (Groovefinder club mix)

Charts

Weekly charts

Year-end charts

Release history

References

19 Recordings singles
2003 singles
2003 songs
Bertelsmann Music Group singles
Gareth Gates songs
Syco Music singles